Newmansville may refer to two places in the United States:
 Newmansville, Illinois
 Newmansville Township, Cass County, Illinois